Robert Peter Kadlec is an American physician and career officer in the United States Air Force who served as Assistant Secretary of Health and Human Services (Preparedness and Response) from August 2017 until January 2021.

Early life
Kadlec graduated with a B.S. from the United States Air Force Academy in 1979, an M.D. from the Uniformed Services University of the Health Sciences in 1983, and an M.A. from Georgetown University in 1989.

Career
Kadlec spent 26 years as a career officer and physician in the United States Air Force. In the White House Homeland Security Council, Kadlec was Director for Biodefense and Special Assistant to President George W. Bush for Biodefense Policy from 2007 to 2009.

Kadlec was Deputy Staff Director for the United States Senate Select Committee on Intelligence when he was nominated by President Donald Trump to become Assistant Secretary for Preparedness and Response (ASPR), an office within Health and Human Services. Kadlec was confirmed for this position by the United States Senate on August 3, 2017, by voice vote.

Office of Preparedness and Response 
In January 2018, Kadlec testified to the U.S. Congress that the US was dangerously unprepared for a pandemic. Prior to the COVID-19 pandemic, Kadlec had heavily focused the office on preparing for a response to bioterror attacks, a choice that was later scrutinized. From January through March 2020, Kadlec and his team focused on evacuating U.S. nationals from cruise ships and countries hard-hit by the pandemic; Kadlec's defenders said that this focus was necessary to protect Americans, while detractors criticized him for missing opportunities to prepare for pandemic COVID-19 in the United States.

In April 2020, Kadlec demoted federal scientist Rick Bright, removing him from his position as head of the Biomedical Advanced Research and Development Authority (BARDA) and reassigning him to a lower post at the National Institutes of Health. The following month, Bright filed a wide-ranging whistleblower complaint against Kadlec and several Trump administration officials. Bright asserted that Kadlec ousted him in retaliation for  his "insistence" that the federal government focus resources on "safe and scientifically vetted solutions" against the COVID-19 pandemic rather than "technologies that lack scientific merit" such as the use of hydroxychloroquine, which had been pushed by the Trump administration. Bright also alleged that in January 2020, Kadlec had delayed acting to obtain face masks, testing swabs, and other materials for which there was later a shortage. Supporters of Bright and supporters of Kadlec each accused the other "of preferential treatment for favored contractors and inappropriate spending decisions." HHS denied that Bright had been retaliated against, but the Office of Special Counsel recommended Bright's reinstatement as BARDA chief, finding a "substantial likelihood of wrongdoing" in his ouster.

Emergent BioSolutions controversies 
Before being appointed by Trump as Assistant Secretary for Preparedness and Response in 2017, Kadlec previously was a consultant for Emergent BioSolutions, a U.S. biotechnology company, and was part-owner of a company related to its founder; he did not disclose these facts in Senate nomination forms during his 2017 confirmation process. Kadlec's company RPK Consulting had provided consulting services to Emergent until 2015. Soon after taking office, Kadlec pushed to increase the government's stockpile of smallpox vaccine from Emergent BioSolutions, and HHS ultimately awarded a 10-year, $2.8 billion single-source contract to the company to purchase its smallpox vaccines at twice the previous price. While renewal of the contract was initially sought on modest terms, Kadlec's office finalized the deal with double the term length (10 years instead of 5 years) and double the number of doses per year (to 18 million). This raised concerns about a potential conflict of interest.

After 15 million Janssen COVID-19 vaccines were ruined due to an error by Emergent BioSolutions (who held a contract to manufacture the vaccines at a Baltimore production facility), a congressional investigation was launched "into whether Emergent used ties to the Trump administration to get billions of dollars in federal contracts despite a history of failing to complete contracts" as well as concerns about "inadequate staff training, persistent quality-control issues, and the company's 'unjustified' 800% price increase for an anthrax vaccine" purchased by the government. The inquiry, launched by the Democratic chairs of the House Committee on Oversight and Reform and Select Oversight Subcommittee on the Coronavirus Crisis, focused in part on Kadlec's role; in a letter, the chairs of the committee wrote that Kadlec "appears to have pushed for" the $628 million award to Emergent to develop the factory "despite indications that Emergent did not have the ability to reliably fulfill the contract."

References

External links
 Biography at U.S. Department of Health and Human Services
 
"National Biodefense Strategy: Protect the Nation Against all Biological Threats," by Dr. Robert Kadlec, U.S. Department of Health and Human Services website.
 Videos:
 
 
 
 21st Century Germ Warfare, by LtC Robert P. Kadlec (Air War College, Studies in National Security No.3, Sep 1998)

Georgetown University alumni
Living people
Trump administration personnel
United States Air Force Academy alumni
United States Air Force officers
United States Department of Health and Human Services officials
Uniformed Services University of the Health Sciences alumni
Year of birth missing (living people)